First Light is an album by flautist Herbie Mann's group The Family of Mann recorded in 1973 and released on the Atlantic label.

Reception

AllMusic awarded the album 4 stars with its review by Jim Newsome stating: "This album is more laidback than most of the Mann catalog from the era, with the rhythmic variations and complementary interplay between the musicians contributing to the feeling of a real band. First Light is one of the classiest and most unified recordings of Herbie Mann's long career".

Track listing 
 "Toot Stick" (Herbie Mann) - 2:20	
 "Davey Blue" (David Newman) - 4:38 	
 "Daffodil" (Tony Levin) - 2:58 	
 "The Turtle and the Frog" (Steve Gadd) - 2:40	
 "Muh Hoss Knows the Way" (Sam Brown) - 2:18 	
 "Music Is a Game We Play" (Levin) - 4:37 	
 "Sunrise Highs" (Brown) - 9:17 	
 "Thank You Mr. Rushing" (Pat Rebillot) - 3:05
 "Mexicali" (Mann) - 4:17 	
 "Lullaby for Mary Elizabeth" (Gadd) - 3:00

Personnel 
Herbie Mann - flute
David Newman - tenor saxophone, flute
Pat Rebillot - keyboards 
Sam Brown - guitar
Tony Levin - bass
Steve Gadd - drums, kalimba, knees
Armen Halburian - percussion
Carlos "Patato" Valdes - congas (track 1)

References 

Herbie Mann albums
1974 albums
Atlantic Records albums